CTAA may refer to:

 Chinese Taipei Athletics Association, a sport organizing body in Taiwan
 Anglo-Argentine Tramways Company (Compañía de Tramways Anglo Argentina), a former transportation company in Argentina